St. Paul Academy and Summit School is a college preparatory independent day school in Saint Paul, Minnesota, United States, for students in grades K–12.

The school was established through a merger in 1969 of St. Paul Academy, a school for boys, and Summit School, a school for girls. St. Paul Academy was founded in 1900 and Summit School in 1917. Accredited by the Independent Schools Association of the Central States, SPA is a member of the National Association of Independent Schools, the Cum Laude Society, and The College Board.

Recent commencement speakers have included Al Franken, Wilhelmina Wright, Coretta Scott King, and Garrison Keillor.

Academics

In the Upper School (grades 9–12), SPA has a college-preparatory liberal arts curriculum. SPA teaches an independent curriculum that does not follow either the AP or IB curriculum models, though individual students may opt to take AP tests. Courses have been taught using Harkness tables, distinctive elliptical wooden tables that seat 12–15 students, since 2005. Each year, the school sends several juniors to semester-away programs including the School for Ethics and Global Leadership in New York, Maine Coast Semester in Maine, and High Mountain Institute in Colorado.

SPA's English department offers all students strong individual attention, helping students develop their analytical reading and writing skills. General courses are offered during freshman and sophomore years, while semester-long electives are offered during junior and senior years.

The language department offers instruction in French, German, Spanish, and Mandarin Chinese (simplified characters) and has optional international exchange programs for students in grades 10–12 with partner schools in France, Germany, Spain, and China. All students in grades K-5 study Spanish and then are given the option to change their course of study in the Middle and Upper School.

For freshman through junior year, the history department has required courses which include two years of World History and one year of American history. In senior year, all history courses are electives.

SPA's math department offers a variety of courses that take most students through a study of Calculus as a senior, prefaced with Algebra 2, Geometry, and Pre-Calculus.

The science department at SPA offers physics, biology, and chemistry for freshman, sophomore, junior years, respectively. In senior year, semester long electives are offered, including environmental science, space science, human physiology, neuroscience, forensics, electricity and magnetism, advanced mechanics, relativity and quantum mechanics, organic chemistry, and advanced science research.

The music offerings include a jazz band, two orchestras, a wind ensembles, a coed choir, a female choir, and two smaller choral groups. The ensembles all offer a fall concert ("Pops Concert") where contemporary music is played as well as a spring concert where more traditional music is featured. SPA also hosts a free music competition every spring for singers and musicians from SPA and the surrounding area.

SPA has a 1:1 technology program whereby the school provides each student in 3rd and 4th grades with an iPad and 5th through 8th grade with a laptop; students in grades 9 through 12 must purchase one from the school. The program originally gave the middle schoolers laptops in 2002 and now enhances learning in grades 3–12. Much of the homework process is streamlined through Google Drive.

Graduation requirements include that seniors complete a 5–8 minute speech in front of the Upper School on a topic of their choice (Senior Speech), as well as a month-long internship in May (Senior Project).

Athletics

St. Paul Academy and Summit School is a member of the Independent Metro Athletic Conference (IMAC), part of the Minnesota State High School League.
The school mascot is a Spartan, and the school's main rivals are Breck School, Blake School and Minnehaha Academy. According to school legend, SPA won the right to wear its school colors (Navy Blue and Vegas Gold) in a football game against Blake more than a century ago. The SPA-Blake rivalry is still regarded as the oldest high school rivalry in the state of Minnesota. SPA offers 15 varsity sports, and 34 teams. To date, Spartan sports teams have won 39 State titles since the school joined the MSHSL in 1975. Varsity letter-winners receive the Academy 'A', a reference to the longtime tradition of simply referring to the school as 'The Academy'.

Hockey
SPA has the oldest varsity hockey squad in the state of Minnesota. The first official team was recorded in 1905. The opponents the team faced during the early years included local colleges St. Thomas as well as the University of Minnesota, which did not field a varsity team until a few years after the academy. The hockey team has won five Minnesota Independent School League (MISL) championships, in 1941, 1942, 1961, 1962, and 1974.

Campuses
The school consists of two campuses: the Goodrich Campus and the Randolph Campus.
The Goodrich Campus, site of the old Summit School for girls, is the current home of the Lower School (grades K–5, ~290 students) and contains the Sarah Converse Auditorium, formerly the home of SPA theater productions. It is located at 1150 Goodrich Avenue.
The Randolph Campus, site of the old St. Paul Academy for boys, is the current home of the Middle School (grades 6–8, ~240 students) as well as the Upper School (grades 9–12, ~380 students). Drake hockey arena, the Harry M. Drake Gallery, and the Huss Center for the Performing Arts are located on this campus, 1712 Randolph Avenue.
School hours are from 8 a.m. to 3 p.m., (8:45 a.m. to 3 p.m. on Wednesdays), with exceptions for after-school activities.

Arts
With four orchestras, two bands, and four choral groups, SPA has a standing culture in the arts. These options feature different musical opportunities for students.
SPA's Upper School dramatic program also hosts a fall play, winter student-directed one-act plays, and a spring musical. The Huss Center for Performing Arts was completed on the Randolph Campus in 2015, with a large stage and rooms for artistic work to be displayed. Before its completion, theater was performed at the Goodrich Campus in the Sarah Converse Auditorium, and orchestral and choral performances were held in the O'Shaughnessy Auditorium at St. Catherine University. Studio arts are displayed in the Harry M. Drake gallery.
In September 2017, SPA's first student-directed musical was performed on the Huss Center stage. The musical was The 25th Annual Putnam County Spelling Bee. It was directed by Jonah Harrison ('17)

Academic teams
SPA currently has a Quiz Bowl team, which is registered with NAQT and participates in the Minnesota High School Quiz Bowl's East Division. SPA sent its A team to the NAQT High School National Championship Tournament in 2014, and both its A and B team in 2015 and 2016. They have continued to send teams in the past years, with one team going in 2017 and 2018. They also have competitive math, debate and science teams. As of the 2014–2015 debate season, the debate team has made the Minnesota State High School Debate Tournament 14 straight years and 17 out of the last 18 years.

SPA also has a print and online news organization: The Rubicon. For over a century, SPA's publication has been one of the school's most prized possessions. In 2018, the publication received a Gold Crown Award from the Columbia Scholastic Press Association, the most prestigious award given to a student news organization. The Rubicon has also picked up Pacemaker awards from the National Scholastic Press Association—the "Pulitzer Prize" of student journalsim—for three years in a row. The online newspaper, RubicOnline.com, updates each of its sections several times per week, and the print edition is released every academic month. Over 40 students are staff members on the publication.

Notable alumni

Laura Coates (1997) is an American attorney and legal analyst for CNN, as well as the host of the 11 p.m. hour of CNN Tonight. Since 2017, she has hosted a talk radio show, The Laura Coates Show, on SiriusXM's Urban View. In January 2021, The Laura Coates Show moved to SiriusXM's POTUS.
Karen Ashe (1972) is director of Neurobiology of Alzheimer's Disease Research Laboratory at the University of Minnesota.
Ann Bancroft (1974) was the first woman to successfully complete expeditions across the Arctic and Antarctic.
Leo Cullen (1994) is a former soccer player.
John Doar (1940) prominent civil rights attorney in the 1960s, who most notably defended James Meredith in his attempt to enroll in the then-segregated University of Mississippi. He was awarded the Presidential Medal of Freedom in 2012.
F. Scott Fitzgerald attended the school from 1908 to 1911, though was asked to leave and did not graduate from the school. His works include The Great Gatsby and This Side of Paradise.
Bill Frenzel (1946) was a member of the United States House of Representatives from Minnesota.
Christopher Gores (1996) played soccer professionally for a team in Puerto Rico.
Reynolds Guyer (1953) invented the Nerf children's toys, along with inventing Twister.
Stanley S. Hubbard (1951) is the founder of Hubbard Broadcasting, which owns TV stations across Minnesota, Wisconsin, New York, and New Mexico (including the Twin Cities ABC affiliate KSTP).
Rebecca Jarvis (1999) is a financial reporter for CNBC and was a finalist on The Apprentice (Season 4).
Dave Kansas (1985) was the chief operating officer of American Public Media Group, a position that he assumed in 2011. Prior, Kansas was a journalist living in London and working for The Wall Street Journal.
Roger G. Kennedy (1944) served as Director of the National Park Service and of the Smithsonian Institution's National Museum of American History. He was a Vice President of the Ford Foundation and has worked for the departments of Labor, Justice, Health and Human Services, and Education.
Manuel Lagos (1990) Played soccer professionally and for the United States national team during the Olympics.
Steven Levitt (1985) is the author of 2005 New York Times bestselling book Freakonomics. He led the SPA Quiz Bowl team to nationals two years in a row.
John C. Lilly (1933) was a neuroscientist, psychoanalylist, philosopher, and inventor, known for his research on dolphin communication and psychedelic drugs. His family is the namesake of SPA's Lilly Courtyard. 
 Amos Magee (born 1971), soccer player, coach, and front office
John Watson Milton is a Minnesota State Senator and writer.
Joan Mondale (1948) was an author, advocate for the arts, and the Second Lady of the United States. She graduated from Summit School, the girls school associated with SPA (the two later merged to become St Paul Academy and Summit School). 
William Pedersen (1956), partner in Kohn Pedersen Fox Associates, is the lead architect on the Shanghai World Financial Center, one of the world's tallest buildings.
Tony Sanneh (1990) is a professional soccer player who has won two Major League Soccer Cups and played every minute for the United States in the 2002 World Cup in Korea/Japan.
John Tate (1942) is a number theorist and winner of the 2010 Abel Prize.
Shirley Williams (attended 1940–43) was a politician and a House of Commons cabinet member in the United Kingdom
Matthew Wolff is a graphic designer known for making soccer logos and jerseys.

References

1900 establishments in Minnesota
Educational institutions established in 1900
High schools in Saint Paul, Minnesota
Preparatory schools in Minnesota
Private elementary schools in Minnesota
Private middle schools in Minnesota
Private high schools in Minnesota